The list of ship launches in 1907 includes a chronological list of some ships launched in 1907.



References

Sources
 
 
 
 

1907
Ship launches